The men's floor gymnastic event at the 2015 Pan American Games was held on July 14 at the Toronto Coliseum.

Schedule
All times are Eastern Standard Time (UTC-3).

Results

Qualification 
Paul Ruggeri of the United States finished in 5th but did not progress to the final because his US teammates, Samuel Mikulak and Donnell Whittenburg qualified ahead of him.

Final

References

Gymnastics at the 2015 Pan American Games